The 2010–11 Kansas Jayhawks men's basketball team represented the University of Kansas in the 2010–11 NCAA Division I men's basketball season, which was the Jayhawks' 113th basketball season. The head coach was Bill Self, who was serving his 8th year. The team played its home games in Allen Fieldhouse in Lawrence, Kansas and are members of the Big 12 Conference. They finished the season 35–3, 14–2 in Big 12 play to claim the regular season conference title. They were also champions of the 2011 Big 12 men's basketball tournament. They earned a #1 seed in the Southwest Region in the 2011 NCAA Division I men's basketball tournament where they defeated Boston University in the second round and Illinois in the third round to advance to the Sweet Sixteen. They defeated Richmond to advance to the Elite Eight where they were upset by VCU.

Pre-Season

Departures 
Sherron Collins finished his senior year at Kansas and graduated in 2010. Junior center Cole Aldrich announced his intention to enter the NBA draft on March 29, 2010, and Xavier Henry announced his intention to enter the NBA draft on April 7, 2010. In mid-August coach Self announced, via press release, the departures of walk-ons C.J. Henry and Chase Buford. According to Self, Henry notified the coaching staff in late July of his intention to transfer to another university where he would continue his collegiate basketball career. Coach Self said that would-be senior Chase Buford would not return to the team in the fall in order to focus on academics.

Recruiting 
Bill Self heavily courted three guards for the 2010–2011 season and landed the biggest one there was in the form of Josh Selby of Baltimore, MD.  Selby committed on April 17 and was expected to fill the hole left by all-star guard Sherron Collins. Selby was rated as the #1 overall recruit in the 2010 class by Rivals.com.  Shooting guard Royce Woolridge of Phoenix, AZrizona, who committed to Kansas in 2009, also joined the team in the fall as a freshman and ranked in Rivals.com's Top 150 recruit list as well.

Zach Peters of Plano, Texas, made an early verbal commitment to Kansas on April 21 for the 2012–2013 season.  The 6-foot-9, 235-pound forward was still in his sophomore year at the time. He chose Kansas over his three other choices: Texas, Kentucky and North Carolina.

On October 12, 4-star point guard Naadir Tharpe signed a letter of intent to join the Jayhawks as a freshman for the 2011–12 season.  The 6-foot prep all-star chose Kansas after withdrawing from Providence.

Class of 2010

|-
| colspan="7" style="padding-left:10px;" | Overall Recruiting Rankings:     Scout – UR     Rivals – 23       ESPN – 23 
|}
Transfers

|}

Accolades
Team
 The Sporting News preseason #4 team.
 Athlon Sports preseason #4 team.
 Blue Ribbon Yearbook preseason #7 team.
 Big 12 Conference preseason #2 team.
 USA Today Coaches Poll #7 team.
 Associated Press Poll #7 team.

Marcus Morris
 Blue Ribbon Yearbook preseason first team All-American.
 John R. Wooden Award candidate.
 All-Big 12 First Team

Josh Selby
 Big 12 Preseason Freshman of the Year.
 All-Big 12 Team Honorable Mention
 Lindy's Preseason Freshman of the Year
 Rivals.com Preseason Freshman of the Year

Tyshawn Taylor
 All-Big 12 Team Honorable Mention

Season summary

Highlights
 The Jayhawks broke the KU home court winning streak record of 62 straight with their 63rd home win in a row over Texas A&M-CC on Nov. 23rd, 2010.  The streak ended at 69 straight home wins with a defeat to Texas on January 22, 2011. The streak was the longest in NCAA basketball since 1992.
 On December 10, David & Suzanne Booth purchased Dr. James Naismith's 13 Original Rules of the game at a Sotheby's auction in New York City for the sum of $4.3 million.  They intend to bring the founding document of basketball back to Lawrence, KS., where it will likely be housed inside Allen Fieldhouse.
 Josh Selby's debut with the Jayhawks on December 18 proved to be worth the buzz, with 21 points, including the game-winning 3 pointer to beat USC 70–68.
 On January 15, Marcus Morris became the 53rd player in Jayhawks history to score 1000 career points.  The victory over Nebraska set a program record of 69 consecutive home wins.
 With a win over Texas A&M on March 2, the Jayhawks clinched their 7th consecutive Big 12 title and an NCAA record-extending 54th overall.
 With a win over Texas on March 12, the Jayhawks won their 8th Big 12 Conference tournament Championship, 25th overall conference tournament championship all-time. The win also officially clinched a berth in the NCAA tournament.
 On March 13, the NCAA Selection Committee named Kansas a #1 seed for the 10th time in school history.  They would face 16 seed Boston University on Friday March 18.
 Reserve forward Thomas Robinson (basketball) made national headlines when, in less than a month's time, his grandparents and mother all died, leaving his sister, Jayla, an orphan. The NCAA granted waivers to the University of Kansas to provide assistance to Thomas and Jayla, enabling Thomas to make sure his sister was cared for while he was still in college.

Awards
Bill Self
 Big 12 Coach of the Year
 Associated Press Big 12 Coach of the Year
 USBWA District VI Coach of the Year

Marcus Morris
 Big 12 Player of the Year
 All-Big 12 First Team
 Associated Press Second Team All-American
 Associated Press Big 12 Player of the Year
 Associated Press All-Big 12 First Team (unanimous)
 Big 12 Tournament Most Outstanding Player
 Yahoo! Sports First Team All-American
 USBWA Second Team All-American
 USBWA District VI Player of the Year
 USBWA All-District VI Team
 NABC Second Team All-American
 NABC All-District 8 First Team
 The Sporting News Second Team All-American
 John R. Wooden Award All-American (top 10 finalist)
 Naismith Award midseason list (top 30)
 Oscar Robertson Trophy finalist (top 10)
 Big 12 Player of the Week (Nov. 29)
 Big 12 Player of the Week (Jan. 17)
 Big 12 Player of the Week (Feb. 14)

Markieff Morris
 All-Big 12 Second Team
 Associated Press All-Big 12 Second Team
 Yahoo! Sports All-America Honorable Mention
 USBWA All-District VI Team
 NABC All-District 8 Second Team
 Big 12 Player of the Week (Dec. 27)

Josh Selby
 Big 12 Rookie of the Week (Dec. 20)
 Big 12 Rookie of the Week (Jan. 31)

Tyshawn Taylor
 Bob Cousy Award finalist (top 20)

Tyrel Reed
 All-Big 12 Honorable Mention
 Associated Press All-Big 12 Honorable Mention
 Lowe's Senior CLASS Award finalist (top 10)
 CoSIDA First Team Academic All-American.
 Capital One Academic All-American First Team
 Capital One Academic All-District 7 team
 Academic All-Big 12 First Team

Brady Morningstar
 Big 12 All Defensive Team
 All-Big 12 Honorable Mention
 Academic All-Big 12 Second Team

Thomas Robinson
 V Foundation Comeback Award finalist

Roster

Schedule 

|-
!colspan=12| Exhibition

|-
!colspan=12| Regular season

|-
!colspan=12| Big 12 tournament

|-
!colspan=12| NCAA tournament

|-

|-

|-

Rankings

See also
 2010–11 Big 12 Conference men's basketball season
 2011 Big 12 men's basketball tournament
 2010-11 NCAA Division I men's basketball season
 2010-11 NCAA Division I men's basketball rankings
 2011 NCAA Division I men's basketball tournament

References 

Kansas Jayhawks men's basketball seasons
Kansas
Kansas
Jay
Jay